Ashok Dharmaraj Patil  is a Shiv Sena politician from Mumbai, Maharashtra. He is current Member of Legislative Assembly from Bhandup Vidhan Sabha constituency of Mumbai, Maharashtra, India as a member of Shiv Sena. He is former Chairman of Mumbai's premium transport service Brihanmumbai Electric Supply and Transport (BEST).

On 3 February 2017, the Bombay High Court criticized Patil for trying to delay the progress of the approved slum redevelopment project by pursuing the cause of non-cooperating members.

The Bombay High Court had exceeded its jurisdiction by criticising the member of Legislative Assembly (MLA) Ashok Patil by its order dated 19/01/2017. Considering the facts & circumstances of the case, any adverse remarks made against him stand expunged by the Supreme Court order Dated 10/02/2017.
Thus the SC verdict highlights that any Democratically elected Representative represents the people and it's his duty to help the Citizens who are in need.
Thus MLA Ashok Patil is a person with Implicable integrity.

Positions held
 2012: Elected as corporator in Brihanmumbai Municipal Corporation 
 2012: Chairman of Brihanmumbai Electric Supply and Transport(BEST) 
 2014: Elected to Maharashtra Legislative Assembly

See also
 Mumbai North East Lok Sabha constituency

References

External links
 Shivsena Official website
 https://archive.today/20141025131412/http://mumbaivotes.com/politicians/387/
 Tata Power installs rain water harvesting plant at salsette division

Businesspeople from Maharashtra
Living people
Maharashtra MLAs 2014–2019
Shiv Sena politicians
Year of birth missing (living people)
People from Mumbai Suburban district
Marathi politicians